Arnett is an unincorporated community in Raleigh County, West Virginia, United States. Arnett has a post office with ZIP code 25007.

An early variant name was Vista.

References

Unincorporated communities in Raleigh County, West Virginia
Unincorporated communities in West Virginia